(born February 19, 1951) is a Japanese composer.

Once the leader and bass player of Japan's new wave rock band EX, composer Shigeru Umebayashi began scoring films in 1985 when the band broke up. He has more than 30 Japanese and Chinese film scores to his credit and is perhaps best known in the West for "Yumeji's Theme" (originally from Seijun Suzuki's Yumeji), included in director Wong Kar-wai's In the Mood for Love (2000). Umebayashi scored most of Wong Kar-wai's follow-up film,  2046 (2004), and House of Flying Daggers. He is also the composer for the music of the first Serbian spectacle, Charleston & Vendetta. Umebayashi received the special "Tomislav Pinter Award" at Avvantura Film Festival Zadar (Croatia) in 2013 during his stay as member of the official Jury.

Filmography

1980s
 Itsuka Darekaga Korosareru (1984)
 Tomoyo Shizukani Nemure (1985)
 Sorekara (1985)
 Sorobanzuku (1986)
 Shinshi Domei (1986)
 Kyohu no Yacchan (1987)
 Getting Blue in Color (1988)

1990s
 Hong Kong Paradise (1990)
 Tekken (1990)
 Yumeji (1991)
 Ote (1991)
 Goaisatsu (1991)
 Arihureta Ai ni Kansuru Chosa (1992)
 Byoin he Iko 2 Yamai ha Kikara (1992)
 Nemuranai Machi Shinjuku Zame (1993)
 Izakaya Yurei (1994)
 Zero Woman (1995)
 Kumokiri Nizaemon (1995)
 Boxer Joe (1995)
 Kitanai Yatsu (1995)
 Hashirana Akan Yoake Made (1995)
 The Christ of Nanjing (1995)
 Shin Gokudo Kisha (1996)
 Izakaya Yurei 2 (1996)
 Ichigo Domei (1997)
 Isana no Umi (1997)
 Watashitachi ga Sukidatta Koto (1997)
 G4 Option Zero (1997)
 Fuyajo (1998)
 Belle Epoch (1998)

2000s
 2000 A.D. (2000)
 Shojo (2000)
 In the Mood for Love (2000)
 Midnight Fly (2001)
 Hikari no Ame (2001)
 Onmyoji (2001)
 Zhou Yu's Train (2002)
 Onmyoji II (2003)
 Floating Land Scape (2003)
 House of Flying Daggers (2004)
 2046 (2004)
 Hibi (2004)
 Fearless (2006)
 Daisy (2006)
 Curse of the Golden Flower (2006)
 Hannibal Rising (2007)
 Absurdistan (2008)
 Incendiary (2008)
 Tears for Sale (2008)
 The Real Shaolin (2008)
 Murderer (2009)
 A Single Man (2009)

2010s
 True Legend (2010)
 Days of Grace (2011)
 Trishna (2011)
 The Grandmaster (2013)
 Rise of the Legend (2014)
 The Bride (2015)
 Crouching Tiger, Hidden Dragon: Sword of Destiny (2016)
 The Wasted Times (2016)

Discography

1980s 

 "Someday Someone will be Killed" Soundtrack (1984)
 Sorekara (1985)
 Bazaar (1986)
 "Sorobanzu" Original Soundtrack (1986)
 Main Title (1986)
 I Can't Lose My Heart Tonight (1986)
 "Yachijin of Terror" Original Soundtrack (1987)
 Do It To Me / Boys / All I Want Is You (1988)
 Ume (1988)

1990s 

 Nightingale's Drum (1992)
 "Teacher Summer Vacation Story" Original Soundtrack (1992)

2000s 

 "Yin Yang Shi" Original Soundtrack (2001)
 Yemeni's Theme (2001)
 Une Adolescente (2002)
 "Yin Yang Division II" Original Soundtrack (2003)
 "House of Flying Daggers" Original Motion Picture Soundtrack (2004)
 Fire (2005)
 The World Of Shigeru Umebayashi 1985-2005 (2006)
 "Jet Li's Fearless" Original Motion Picture Soundtrack (2006)
 "Daisy" Original Motion Picture Soundtrack (2006)
 "Curse Of The Golden Flower" Original Motion Picture Soundtrack (2007)

2010s 

 For the Record (2010)
 "The Grandmaster" Original Scores By Shigeru Umebayashi And Nathaniel Mechaly (2013)
 "Sword of Destiny" Soundtrack (2016)
 "Rise Of The Legend" Original Motion Picture Soundtrack (2016)

2020s
Ghost of Tsushima (2020)

See also

List of soundtrack composers

References

External links
Official website
October 2009 video interview in Greek, from the Ghent Film Festival 2009
February 2005 interview
Oticons Film Music Composers Agency - Shigeru Umebayashi Profile

Discogs discography

1951 births
Japanese film score composers
Japanese male film score composers
Living people
People from Kitakyushu
Varèse Sarabande Records artists